Nandi Awards for the year 1999 announced by Andhra Pradesh Government at a news conference in Hyderabad. Venkatesh starer Kalisundam Raa has won the best film award followed by Nee Kosam and Prema Katha. Venkatesh has won Best actor Award for Kalisundham Raa, Maheswari has won the best actress award for Nee Kosam and Ramgopal Varma won the best director award for Prema Katha.

1999 Nandi Awards Winners List

References

1999
1999 Indian film awards